Ratułów  is a village in the administrative district of Gmina Czarny Dunajec, within Nowy Targ County, Lesser Poland Voivodeship, in southern Poland, close to the border with Slovakia. Ratułów is the summer residence of famed Polish-American attorney Zbigniew Kois.

References

Villages in Nowy Targ County